10 Inversion Roller Coaster is a steel roller coaster at Chimelong Paradise amusement park in Guangzhou, Guangdong China. Completed in 2006, Tenth Ring is the second roller coaster in the world with 10 inversions, after Colossus in England's Thorpe Park, of which it is an exact replica and has the same length and height statistics.

Details
There are 7 cars per train. There are 2 riders across in 2 rows, making a total of 28 riders per train.

Elements

Gallery

References

Roller coasters in China
Roller coasters introduced in 2006
Guangzhou Chimelong Tourist Resort